Igor Murín (born 1 March 1973) is a Slovak ice hockey player. He competed in the men's tournament at the 1998 Winter Olympics.

References

1973 births
Living people
Slovak ice hockey goaltenders
Olympic ice hockey players of Slovakia
Ice hockey players at the 1998 Winter Olympics
Sportspeople from Trenčín
HK Dukla Trenčín players
PSG Berani Zlín players
Czechoslovak ice hockey goaltenders
Slovak expatriate ice hockey players in the Czech Republic